Channelview Independent School District is a school district in Channelview, a census-designated place in an unincorporated area of Harris County, Texas, United States. As of 2022, CISD's superintendent is Dr. Tory Hill.

In 2010, the school district is rated "recognized" by the Texas Education Agency.

History
The district was established in 1937.

Class organization

Starting in the 2007-2008 school year, Channelview ISD will be combining the Primary and Elementary schools into K-5 schools and Cobb Elementary will take all 6th Grade students in the district. In the spring of 2008, CISD will open the new Kolarik Freshman campus, right next to the current high school.  Formerly, Channelview ISD operated on a K-3, 4-6, 7-8, 9-12 grade level split.

School uniforms
All students in grades Kindergarten through 8 are required to wear school uniforms. The Texas Education Agency specifies that the parents and/or guardians of students zoned to a school with uniforms may apply for a waiver to opt out of the uniform policy so their children do not have to wear the uniform; parents must specify "bona fide" reasons, such as religious reasons or philosophical objections.

Schools

High schools
6A
 Channelview High School
 Endeavor
 Kolarik 9th Grade Center

Middle schools
 Alice Johnson Junior High School
 Lance Cpl. Anthony Aguirre Junior High

K-5 Schools
 Cobb
 Crenshaw
 DeZavala
 Hamblen
 Harvey Brown
 McMullan
 Schochler

Pre-Kindergarten Schools
Channelview Children's Center

External links

Notes

School districts in Harris County, Texas
1937 establishments in Texas
School districts established in 1937